Peter Lucas may refer to:

 Peter Lucas (footballer) (1929–2019), former Australian rules footballer
 Peter Lucas (rower) (1933–2001), former New Zealand rower
 Peter J. Lucas (born 1962), Polish and American actor
 Peter J. A. Lucas (1914–1994), British soldier awarded the Military Cross
 Peter Lucas (documentary film-maker), a 2011 Guggenheim Fellow
 Peter Lucas (computer scientist) (1935–2015), Austrian computer scientist